The Third Kohl cabinet led by Helmut Kohl was sworn in on March 12, 1987. The cabinet was formed after the 1987 elections. This cabinet oversaw the German Reunification. It laid down its function on January 18, 1991, after the formation of the Fourth Kohl cabinet, which was formed following the 1990 elections.

Composition

|}

References

Kohl
1987 establishments in West Germany
1991 disestablishments in Germany
Cabinets established in 1987
Cabinets disestablished in 1991
Helmut Kohl
Kohl III